The 1995 PPG/Firestone Indy Lights Championship Powered By Buick consisted of 12 races. Canadian Greg Moore completely dominated the season, winning 10 times and winning the championship by over 100 points over his closest rival.

Calendar

Race summaries

Miami race
Held March 5 at Miami Bicentennial Park. Greg Moore won the pole and the bonus point for leading the most laps.

Top Five Results
 Greg Moore
 Jeff Ward
 Pedro Chaves
 Robbie Buhl
 Doug Boyer

Full Results

Phoenix race
Held April 2 at Phoenix International Raceway. Claude Bourbonnais won the pole. Affonso Giaffone jumped the field on the final restart and finished the race first but he was assessed a one-lap penalty for jumping the restart, handing the win to Greg Moore. Giaffone still got the bonus point for leading the most laps.

Top Five Results
 Greg Moore
 Robbie Buhl
 Buzz Calkins
 Doug Boyer
 Affonso Giaffone

Full Results

Long Beach race
Held April 9 at Long Beach, California Street Course. Greg Moore won the pole and got the bonus point for leading the most laps.

Top Five Results
 Greg Moore
 Robbie Buhl
 David DeSilva
 Alex Padilla
 Pedro Chaves

Full Results

Nazareth race
Held April 23 at Nazareth Speedway. Bob Dorricott Jr won the pole and Greg Moore got the bonus point for leading the most laps. Originally Robbie Buhl set fastest qualifying time, but was disqualified due to underweight.

Top Five Results
 Greg Moore
 Affonso Giaffone
 Robbie Buhl
 Buzz Calkins
 Doug Boyer

Full Results

Milwaukee race
Held June 4 at The Milwaukee Mile. Robbie Buhl won the pole and Greg Moore got the bonus point for leading the most laps.

Top Five Results
 Greg Moore
 Affonso Giaffone
 Buzz Calkins
 Robbie Buhl
 Mark Hotchkis

Full Results

Detroit race
Held June 11 at Belle Isle Raceway. Robbie Buhl won the pole, got the bonus point for leading the most laps, and won the race at his home track. This race featured a huge crash on the first lap that ended with Enrique Contreras upside down. He would unbuckle while still upside down and walk away uninjured.

Top Five Results
 Robbie Buhl
 Greg Moore
 Jeff Ward
 Nick Firestone
 Affonso Giaffone

Full Results

Portland race
Held June 25 at Portland International Raceway. Greg Moore won the pole and got the bonus point for leading the most laps.

Top Five Results
 Greg Moore
 Affonso Giaffone
 Nick Firestone
 Mike Borkowski
 Buzz Calkins

Full Results

Toronto race
Held July 16 at Exhibition Place. Greg Moore won the pole and got the bonus point for leading the most laps.

Top Five Results
 Greg Moore
 Robbie Buhl
 Doug Boyer
 Affonso Giaffone
 José Luis Di Palma

Full Results

Cleveland race
Held July 23 at Burke Lakefront Airport. Greg Moore won the pole, got the bonus point for leading the most laps, and by winning this race he clinched the championship with three races remaining. On the last lap Trevor Seibert had a spectacular end over end accident. He was not injured.

Top Five Results
 Greg Moore
 Pedro Chaves
 Doug Boyer
 Mark Hotchkis
 Buzz Calkins

Full Results

Loudon race
Held August 20 at New Hampshire International Speedway. Robbie Buhl won the pole and got the bonus point for leading the most laps.

Top Five Results
 Greg Moore
 Claude Bourbonnais
 Robbie Buhl
 Pedro Chaves
 Mark Hotchkis

Full Results

Vancouver race
Held September 3 at Pacific Place. Greg Moore won the pole and got the bonus point for leading the most laps.

Top Five Results
 Pedro Chaves
 Doug Boyer
 Robbie Buhl
 Affonso Giaffone
 Greg Moore

Full Results

Laguna Seca race
Held September 10 at Mazda Raceway Laguna Seca. Greg Moore won the pole and got the bonus point for leading the most laps. This was his seventh race of the season he scored the maximum number of points available.

Top Five Results
 Greg Moore
 Affonso Giaffone
 Doug Boyer
 Pedro Chaves
 Nick Firestone

 This was Greg Moores 13th and final Indy Lights victory in his final Indy Lights race. His race victory total is an all time record which as of 2019 is still unbroken.
Full Results

Final points standings

Driver

For every race the points were awarded: 20 points to the winner, 16 for runner-up, 14 for third place, 12 for fourth place, 10 for fifth place, 8 for sixth place, 6 seventh place, winding down to 1 points for 12th place. Additional points were awarded to the pole winner (1 point) and to the driver leading the most laps (1 point).

Complete Overview

R22=retired, but classified NS=did not start

Indy Lights seasons
Indy Lights Season, 1995
Indy Lights